Rena Galibova (Russian: Рена Абрамовна Галибова, Tajik: Раъно Абрамовна Ғолибова) (May 24, 1915 – September 10, 1995) was a Tajik actress and opera singer who was named the People's Artist of Tajikistan. She was born in the city of Kokand in 1915 to a progressive Bukharan Jewish family. Her childhood years were spent in Tashkent, where her father was a theatrical producer. 

Having gotten musical education from her father, Rena Galibova began her theatrical career at 13. Soon she was noticed and by the age of 18 she was invited to work on Tashkent Radio. There she worked with many famous Uzbek and Bukharian artists.

In 1934 Rena Galibova married a known Bukharian writer, Gavriel Samandarov, and in 1938 they moved to Stalinabad (now Dushanbe), Tajikistan. There Rena Galibova continued her theatrical career in the Theater of Opera and Ballet where she took on many leading roles. 

In 1939, Rena Galibova was awarded the title of Merited Artist of Tajikistan and in 1941 she was given the title of People's Artist of Tajikistan as well as the Order of Lenin after she performed in front of Joseph Stalin and he was very impressed by her talent.

During World War II Rena Galibova was one of many Bukharan Jews artists who performed throughout the USSR in the war effort. After the war Rena Galibova continued to perform in many cities and towns of the USSR. In 1957 she was welcomed on the scene of Bolshoi Theater in Moscow. Later in her life Rena Galibova moved to the United States and lived in Boston, where she died at the age of 80 in 1995. Her gravestone, in Mount Carmel Cemetery, Queens, reads "Honored Artist of Tajikistan".

References

1915 births
1995 deaths
People from Kokand
People from Fergana Oblast
Bukharan Jews
Soviet Jews
Soviet women singers
20th-century Tajikistani women singers
Soviet emigrants to the United States
Recipients of the Order of Lenin
Recipients of the Order of the Red Banner of Labour
Communist Party of the Soviet Union members